Taittirīya is a shaka (school) of the Black Yajurveda
Taittiriya Samhita (TS), see Black Yajurveda
Taittiriya Upanishad (TU)